Jan Cools (born 1 October 1918) was a Belgian wrestler. He competed at the 1948 Summer Olympics and the 1952 Summer Olympics.

References

External links
 

1918 births
Possibly living people
Belgian male sport wrestlers
Olympic wrestlers of Belgium
Wrestlers at the 1948 Summer Olympics
Wrestlers at the 1952 Summer Olympics
Sportspeople from Antwerp